Sarabande is the second solo album by Jon Lord recorded in September 1975 near Düsseldorf (Germany). The orchestra Philharmonia Hungarica was conducted by Eberhard Schoener.

The complete Sarabande suite was premiered in live performance in Budapest on 18 September 2010 and later in Sofia on 30 October and Essen on 15 November. Lord amended the 1975 orchestrations, and also orchestrated Aria, which was played on piano and synthesisers on the recording, and Caprice which was simply a group performance on record. 'Finale' was rearranged to allow the ‘parade of themes’ section (which was done with tape-loops on the recording) to be played live.

Cover art
The cover shows the drawing of an ouroboros, a mythological snake, biting its own tail on which three naked women ride. The woman on the right stands in a position similar to the woman on the cover of Whitesnake's later Lovehunter album, on which Lord played. The original Jon Lord sleeve was designed by Kosh, and the illustration by Mike Bryan.

Track listing

 "Fantasia" – 3:30
 "Sarabande" – 7:20
 "Aria" – 3:42
 "Gigue" – 11:06
 "Bourée" – 11:00
 "Pavane" – 7:35
 "Caprice" – 3:12
 "Finale" – 2:03

Musicians

 Jon Lord - Hammond organ, piano, clavinet, synthesisers
 Andy Summers - Guitar
 Paul Karass - Bass guitar
 Pete York - Drums
 Mark Nauseef - Percussion
 The Philharmonia Hungarica directed by Eberhard Schoener

Production notes

Recorded 3–6 September 1975 at the Stadthalle Oer-Erkenschwick, near Düsseldorf, Germany with the Dieter Dierks Mobile Recording Studio, using Agfa P.E.M. 408 master tape
Remixed by Martin Birch at Musicland Studios, Munich, Germany
Assistant engineer: Hans Menzel
Record mastered at Kendun Recorders, Burbank, California
Produced by Jon Lord and Martin Birch
Engineered by Martin Birch
Technical advisor: Mike Phillips
Project managed and overseen by Tony Edwards

References

1976 albums
Albums produced by Martin Birch
Jon Lord albums
Purple Records albums